The works composed by Mauro Giuliani are:

Giuliani, Mauro, compositions by